Graham flour is a type of coarse-ground flour of whole wheat named after Sylvester Graham. It is similar to conventional whole-wheat flour in that both are made from the whole grain, but graham flour is ground more coarsely.  It is not sifted ("Bolted") with a flour dresser after milling. A report from 1913 claimed that bread made from graham flour had a protein content of 12.1% – only slightly less than white wheat flour and essentially the same as whole wheat flour.

Sources 
Graham flour is available at health food stores, some grocery stores, bakery supply stores, and some specialty and gourmet food shops, or directly from a flour mill that has experience making it.

A substitute for it would be a mix of unbleached white flour and wheat middlings; this was a common substitute prior to and after the passage of the Pure Food and Drug Act in 1906, but the FDA gradually established standards and eliminated imitations from the market.

History 
Graham flour is named after Sylvester Graham (1794–1851), an early advocate for dietary reform. Graham despised the discarding of nutrients such as germ and bran when making flour for white bread.  He believed that using all of the grain in the milling of flour and baking of bread was a remedy for the poor health of his fellow Americans during changes in diet brought on by the Industrial Revolution.

See also 
 Flour bleaching agent
 Graham bread
 Graham cracker
 Graham cracker crust
 Whole-wheat of wheat berry, sometimes eaten on its own

References

External links 
 

Flour